Citizen of Glass is the third studio album by Danish singer-songwriter Agnes Obel, released on 21 October 2016 by PIAS Recordings. Four tracks were selected as singles: "Familiar", "Golden Green", "It's Happening Again", and "Stretch Your Eyes". Obel launched a European tour at the end of October 2016, followed by a North American tour in February 2017.

Background
On this album, Obel evokes the German concept of Gläserner Bürger, the "citizen of glass", as the guiding thread of the album, a citizen whose body and life are known to everyone. She discovered this term during her previous tour, while reading the news about the Edward Snowden case and citizen surveillance. Questions of transparency and privacy are themes that inspired her, forcing her to think about what she reveals of herself in her music. She worked on the concept of "glass" to create new songs, particularly by adding new instruments to her repertoire such as the trautonium, a rare instrument from the late 1920s whose crystalline sounds are reminiscent of glass.

Reception

Citizen of Glass received universal acclaim from music critics. At Metacritic, which assigns a normalized rating out of 100 to reviews from mainstream critics, the album received an average score of 82, citing "universal acclaim", based on 11 reviews.

John Murphy from musicOMH wrote "Some earlier fans of Obel may miss the more minimal sound of her early albums, and there’s certainly no big crossover track that will propel Obel to the mainstream. This is a haunting listen though, and one that will provide suitable company as the long winter nights start to draw in."

James Christopher Monger at AllMusic wrote "Where her relatively austere prior outings relied largely on piano and strings, Citizen of Glass revels in ghostly electronics and voice modulation, even going so far as to bring in a temperamental, late-'20s monophonic synthesizer called a Trautonium. The string arrangements are more ambitious and the composition style is a bit more opaque, but the ten-track set is unequivocally Obel-esque."

Track listing

Charts

Weekly charts

Year-end charts

Certifications

References

2016 albums
Agnes Obel albums
PIAS Recordings albums